Chicuarotes is a 2019 Mexican drama film directed by Gael García Bernal. It was screened in the Contemporary World Cinema section at the 2019 Toronto International Film Festival. It was selected for competition at the 2019 Shanghai International Film Festival.

Cast
 Daniel Giménez Cacho as Chillamil
 Dolores Heredia as Tonchi
 Ricardo Abarca as Planchado 
 Benny Emmanuel as Cagalera
 Enoc Leaño as Baturro
 Leidi Gutiérrez as Sugheili
 Gabriel Carbajal as Moloteco
 Pedro Joaquín as Víctor
 Esmeralda Ortiz as Güily
 Saúl Mercado as Karina
 Luis Enrique Basurto as Churrizo

References

External links
 

2019 films
2019 drama films
Mexican drama films
2010s Spanish-language films
2010s Mexican films